The Upper Saddle River School District is a community public school district that serves students in pre-kindergarten through eighth grade in Upper Saddle River in Bergen County, New Jersey, United States.

As of the 2018–19 school year, the district, comprising three schools, had an enrollment of 1,133 students and 108.5 classroom teachers (on an FTE basis), for a student–teacher ratio of 10.4:1.

The district is classified by the New Jersey Department of Education as being in District Factor Group "J", the highest of eight groupings. District Factor Groups organize districts statewide to allow comparison by common socioeconomic characteristics of the local districts. From lowest socioeconomic status to highest, the categories are A, B, CD, DE, FG, GH, I and J.

For high school, public school students in Upper Saddle River for ninth through twelfth grades attend Northern Highlands Regional High School, which also serves students from Allendale and Ho-Ho-Kus, along with some of Saddle River's students (who have the option of attending either Northern Highlands or Ramsey High School, as part of sending/receiving relationships with the two districts). As of the 2018–19 school year, the high school had an enrollment of 1,377 students and 110.4 classroom teachers (on an FTE basis), for a student–teacher ratio of 12.5:1.

History
Through the start of the 1957-58 school year, students from Upper Saddle River, as well as those from Allendale, Mahwah and Saddle River all attended Ramsey High School as part of sending/receiving relationships with the respective districts and the Ramsey Public School District. Allendale, Mahwah and Upper Saddle River left the Ramsey district in September 1958 once Mahwah High School was completed; Allendale and Upper Saddle River joined the Northern Highlands District once the school was opened in 1965.

Awards and recognition
Edith A. Bogert Elementary School was honored by the National Blue Ribbon Schools Program in 2019, one of nine schools in the state recognized as Exemplary High Performing Schools.

Schools 
The schools in the district (with 2018–19 enrollment data from the National Center for Education Statistics) are:
Elementary schools
Robert D. Reynolds Primary School with 326 students in grades PreK-2
Devin Severs, Principal
Edith A. Bogert Elementary School with 377 students in grades 3-5
David Kaplan, Principal
Middle school
Emil A. Cavallini Middle School with 414 students in grades 6-8
James J. McCusker, Principal

Administration
Core members of the district's administration include:
Brad Siegel, Superintendent
Dana Imbasciani, Business Administrator / Board Secretary

Board of education
The district's board of education, with nine members, sets policy and oversees the fiscal and educational operation of the district through its administration. As a Type II school district, the board's trustees are elected directly by voters to serve three-year terms of office on a staggered basis, with three seats up for election each year held (since 2012) as part of the November general election. The board appoints a superintendent to oversee the day-to-day operation of the district.

As of 2012, school elections were shifted from April to the November general election as part of an effort to reduce the costs of a standalone April vote.

References

External links 
Upper Saddle River Public Schools

Upper Saddle River Public Schools, National Center for Education Statistics
Northern Highlands Regional High School

Upper Saddle River, New Jersey
School districts in Bergen County, New Jersey
New Jersey District Factor Group J